Radenko Dobraš (born January 31, 1968) is a Serbian former basketball player. He played the guard position. He was named to the 1993 Israeli Basketball Premier League Quintet.

Biography
Dobraš was born and grew up in Banja Luka, Bosnia and Herzegovina, then part of Yugoslavia. He is 6' 7" (201 cm) tall.

He was a member of the Yugoslavian Junior National Basketball Team.

Dobraš attended the University of South Florida from 1988 to 1992, playing for the South Florida Bulls.  He held the school's assist record for over a decade, with 534. He was on the Sun Belt Conference All-Freshman Team in 1988–89 when he led the conference in steals with 59, all-conference second team as a sophomore, first-team as a junior when he was fourth in the conference in points per game with 18.7, and Metro Conference first team as a senior when he was second in the conference in assists with 149. He was the MVP of the 1990 Sun Belt Conference men's basketball tournament. Dobraš had his jersey retired in 2002. He was inducted into the University of South Florida Athletic Hall of Fame in 2011.

Dobraš played for Hapoel Tel Aviv and Hapoel Jerusalem. He was named to the 1993 Israeli Basketball Premier League Quintet.

References 

1968 births
Living people
Alba Berlin players
Brose Bamberg players
Guards (basketball)
Hapoel Jerusalem B.C. players
Hapoel Tel Aviv B.C. players
Israeli Basketball Premier League players
South Florida Bulls men's basketball players
Yugoslav expatriate basketball people
Yugoslav men's basketball players